The year 1960 saw a number of significant happenings in radio broadcasting history.


Events
25 January – The National Association of Broadcasters in Washington, D.C. reacts to the payola scandal by threatening fines for any disc jockeys who accepted money for playing particular records.
8 February – Congressional investigations begin into payola in the radio and record industries.
29 February – The radio program At Your Service debuts on St. Louis radio station KMOX. The program is believed to be first locally produced radio talk show, that helps launch the talk radio format in the US.
(date unknown) – KFMA (1580 AM) of Davenport, Iowa switches its call letters to KWNT. By now, the format is full-time country music and the station is the only one in the Quad Cities market to devote itself exclusively to the genre.

Debuts
15 May – WFVA-FM debuts.
19 June – The Associated Broadcasting Company is founded in the Philippines.

Endings
1 January – The NBC Radio Theater ends its run on network radio (NBC).
23 March – The Second Mrs. Burton ends its run on network radio (CBS).
27 August – The Louisiana Hayride puts on its final show.
25 November – The long-running serial, Ma Perkins, airs its last episode on the CBS radio network.

Births
3 January – Liz Kershaw, UK radio presenter
13 February – Delilah, nationally syndicated US love-song request-and-dedication host
10 March – Anne MacKenzie, Scottish broadcast journalist
1 August – Chuck D, American rapper, composer, actor, author, radio personality and producer

References

 
Radio by year